Poggi is an Italian surname, derived from the word poggio, meaning knoll. Notable people with the surname include:

 Amelio Poggi (1914–1974), Italian bishop and diplomat 
 Ansaldo Poggi, Italian luthier
 Antonio Poggi, Italian tenor
 Biff Poggi, American football coach
 Cesare Poggi, Italian painter
 Claudio Poggi, Argentinian politician
 Daniela Poggi, Italian actress 
 Dario Poggi, Italian bobsledder 
 Enrico Poggi, Italian sailor
 Fabrizio Poggi, singer and harmonica player
 Federico Poggi, Argentinian footballer
 Ferdinando Poggi, Italian actor 
 Gianni Poggi, Italian tenor
 Giorgio Poggi, Italian sailor
 Giuseppe Poggi, Italian architect
 Louis Poggi (footballer), French footballer 
 Luigi Poggi, Italian cardinal
 Luigi Poggi (sailor), Italian sailor
 Matteo Poggi, Italian footballer 
 Paolo Poggi, Italian footballer

Surnames of Italian origin
Italian toponymic surnames